"A Scottish Soldier" is a song written by Andy Stewart using the tune of "The Green Hills of Tyrol", which was transcribed by John MacLeod during the Crimean War from "La Tua Danza Sì Leggiera", a chorus part in the third act of Gioachino Rossini's 1829 opera  Guglielmo Tell (William Tell). The song is about a dying Scottish soldier, wishing to return to the hills of his homeland rather than die in the Tyrol. The song was one of two US chart entries by Andy Stewart. "A Scottish Soldier" reached no. 1 in Canada, Australia, and New Zealand. It spent 36 weeks in the UK Singles Chart in 1961.

This song was the entrance theme of professional wrestler "Rowdy" Roddy Piper.

External links
 About the song
 Andy Stewart Page
 Sheet music of "The Green Hills of Tyrol"

References

Scottish songs
Scottish folk songs
Scottish patriotic songs
Songs about the military
Songs about soldiers
Songs about Scotland